Annin Township is a township in McKean County, Pennsylvania, United States.

Geography
It is the smallest township in McKean County.

Demographics

As of the census of 2000, there were 835 people, 311 households, and 236 families residing in the township. The population density was 24.9 people per square mile (9.6/km2). There were 399 housing units at an average density of 11.9/sq mi (4.6/km2). The racial makeup of the township was 98.20% White, 0.24% African American, 1.08% Native American, 0.12% Asian, and 0.36% from two or more races. Hispanic or Latino of any race were 0.12% of the population.

There were 311 households, out of which 36.7% had children under the age of 18 living with them, 62.4% were married couples living together, 7.7% had a female householder with no husband present, and 23.8% were non-families. 20.6% of all households were made up of individuals, and 6.8% had someone living alone who was 65 years of age or older. The average household size was 2.68 and the average family size was 3.05.

In the township the population was spread out, with 27.4% under the age of 18, 6.6% from 18 to 24, 28.6% from 25 to 44, 23.8% from 45 to 64, and 13.5% who were 65 years of age or older. The median age was 37 years. For every 100 females, there were 111.9 males. For every 100 females age 18 and over, there were 113.4 males.

The median income for a household in the township was $37,039, and the median income for a family was $42,569. Males had a median income of $35,000 versus $22,222 for females. The per capita income for the township was $15,703. About 9.3% of families and 11.1% of the population were below the poverty line, including 12.2% of those under age 18 and 6.1% of those age 65 or over.

Notable person
Susan “Busty Heart” Sykes, big-bust model and strip club proprietor

References

Populated places established in 1836
Townships in McKean County, Pennsylvania
Townships in Pennsylvania
1836 establishments in Pennsylvania